The University of San Francisco (USF) is a private Jesuit university in San Francisco, California. The university's main campus is located on a  setting between the Golden Gate Bridge and Golden Gate Park. The main campus is nicknamed "The Hilltop" and is split into two sections within a block of each other. Part of the main campus is located on Lone Mountain, one of San Francisco's major geographical features. Its close historical ties with the City and County of San Francisco are reflected in the university's traditional motto, Pro Urbe et Universitate ('For the City and University').

History

Founded by the Jesuits in 1855 as St. Ignatius Academy, USF started as a one-room schoolhouse along Market Street in what later became downtown San Francisco. Father Anthony Maraschi, S.J. (1820-1897) was the college's founder and  first president, a professor, the college's treasurer, and the first pastor of St. Ignatius Church. Under Maraschi, St. Ignatius Academy received its charter to issue college degrees on April 30, 1859, from the State of California, and signed by governor John B. Weller. In that year, the school changed its name to St. Ignatius College.

The original curriculum included Greek, Spanish, Latin, English, French, Italian, algebra, arithmetic, history, geography, elocution, and bookkeeping.

A new building was constructed in 1862 to replace the first frame building. In June 1863, the university awarded its first Bachelor of Arts degree. In 1880, the college moved from Market Street to a new site on the corner of Hayes Street and Van Ness Avenue (currently occupied by the Davies Symphony Hall).

The third St. Ignatius College received moderate damage in the 1906 San Francisco earthquake, but was completely destroyed in the ensuing fire. The campus moved west, to the corner of Hayes and Shrader Streets, close to Golden Gate Park. It occupied a hastily constructed structure known as the Shirt Factory (for its resemblance to similar manufacturing buildings of the era) for the next 21 years. The college moved to its present site on Fulton Street in 1927, on the site of a former Masonic Cemetery.

To celebrate its diamond jubilee in 1930, St. Ignatius College changed its name to the University of San Francisco. The change from college to university was sought by many alumni groups and by long-time San Francisco Mayor James Rolph Jr.

A male-only school for most of its history, USF became fully coeducational in 1964, though women started attending the evening programs in business and law as early as 1927. In 1969, the high school division, already wholly separate from the university, moved to the western part of San Francisco and became St. Ignatius College Preparatory. In 1978, the university acquired Lone Mountain College. October 15, 2005, marked the 150th anniversary of the university's founding. In the fall of 2017, USF enrolled 11,080 undergraduate and graduate students in all of its programs housed in four schools (Law; Management; Education; Nursing and Health Professions) and one college (Arts and Sciences).

Academics

Rankings

 USF was ranked tied for 103rd overall by U.S. News & World Report, tied for 68th "Best College for Veterans", and tied for 69th in "Best Value" in the National University category in 2020.
 According to College Factual's 2022 Best Colleges list, USF is ranked in the top 10% of all four-year colleges and universities in the nation.
 Washington Monthly ranked USF 148th out of 389 national universities in 2020 based on its contribution to the public good, as measured by social mobility, research, and promotion of public service.

Global education
USF's Center for Global Education advises students on international programs sponsored by USF or external organizations and schools and facilitates the process.  USF has more than 40 institutional partnerships with other universities throughout the world, including in Argentina, Australia, Belgium, Brazil, the Czech Republic, Chile, China, El Salvador, England, Finland, France, Germany, Hungary, Ireland, Italy, Japan, South Korea, Mexico, Netherlands, New Zealand, Nicaragua, the Philippines, Scotland, Singapore, South Africa, Spain, Taiwan, Thailand, and Uruguay. USF offers 133 semester-long international programs to its students. During the 2016–2017 academic year, 721 USF students earned academic credit through study abroad, exchange, intern, or social justice programs. Several USF students have received the Gilman Award for their participation in study abroad programs through the center.

Campuses 

The University of San Francisco offers more than 230 undergraduate, graduate, professional, and certificate programs on its main Hilltop Campus. USF also offers programs at several additional campuses.

The USF Downtown San Francisco Campus, founded in the Folger Coffee Company Building at 101 Howard Street in 2012, offers the MBA and the Executive MBA, MBA Dual Degree programs, and master's degrees in Entrepreneurship and Innovation, Financial Analysis, Global Entrepreneurial Management, Nonprofit Administration, Organization Development, and Public Administration.

The Orange County Campus, founded in Orange in 1983, offers the Master's in Sport Management and the Master's in Nursing for Non-Nurses.

The Pleasanton Campus, founded in San Ramon in 1986, then moved to Pleasanton in 2012, offers a Bachelor's in Management (Degree Completion), the Master's in Nursing for the Registered Nurse, and the Master's in Teaching with the Single or Multiple Subject Teaching Credential.

The Presidio Campus, founded at the San Francisco Presidio in 2003, offers the Master in Behavior Health, the Master of Public Health, and the Doctor of Psychology (PsyD) in Clinical Psychology.

The Sacramento Campus, founded in 1975, offers the Bachelor of Science in Nursing, the Master of Public Health, the Master's in Counseling with an Emphasis in Marriage and Family Therapy, and the Master's in Teaching with the Single or Multiple Subject Teaching Credential.

The San Jose Campus, founded in 1980, offers the Master's in Information Systems, the Master's in Teaching with the Single or Multiple Subject Teaching Credential, the Master's in Counseling with an Emphasis in Marriage and Family Therapy, and the RN to MSN Nursing/Clinical Nurse Leader.

The Santa Rosa Campus, founded in 1989, offers the Master's in Counseling with an Emphasis in Marriage and Family Therapy, and the Master's in Teaching with the Single or Multiple Subject Teaching Credential.

Campus buildings

 Saint Ignatius Church (1914)
 Kalmanovitz Hall (1927/2008)
 School of Education Building (1930)
 Lone Mountain (1932)
 Gleeson Library (1950) and the Geschke Learning Resource Center (1997)
 Toler Hall (1955)
 War Memorial Gymnasium (1958)
 Ulrich Field (1958)
 Fromm Hall (1959/2003)
 The Koret Law Center: Kendrick Hall (1962) and Dorraine Zief Law Library (2000)
 Lone Mountain North (1963)
 Gillson Hall (1965)
 Harney Science Center (1965)
 Hayes-Healy Hall (1966)
 University Center (1966)
 Cowell Hall (1969)
 Negoesco Stadium (1982)
 USF Koret Health and Recreation Center (1989)
 Loyola House (1999)
 281 Masonic (2000)
 Pedro Arrupe Hall (2000)
 Loyola Village (2002)
 Malloy Hall (2004)
 John Lo Schiavo, S.J. Center for Science and Innovation (2013)
 Lone Mountain East (2021)
 Sobrato Center (2015)

Organization and administration

The University of San Francisco is chartered as a non-profit organization and is governed by a privately appointed board of trustees, along with the university president, the university chancellor, the university provost and vice-presidents, and the deans. The board currently has 43 voting members who serve three, three-year terms and is chaired by Stephen A. Hamill. The board of trustees elects a president to serve as the general manager and chief executive of the university. The current president (since August 1, 2014) is Paul J. Fitzgerald, S.J. The president, according to USF Bylaws, is specifically responsible for articulating and advancing the Jesuit Catholic character of the university.

USF's faculty and librarians are unionized. The University of San Francisco Faculty Association, a local of the California Federation of Teachers, represents its members in all matters concerning wages, benefits, and enforcing the Collective Bargaining Agreement. The USFFA is consulted by the USF administration on matters affecting the working conditions of the faculty and librarians. Economics professor Michael Lehmann was the founding president of the Union in 1975.

Student clubs and organizations
USF is home to over 90 clubs and organizations, including academic/professional, governance, cultural, service, social, political, athletic, and special interest. The missions and goals of USF's student clubs and organizations are to provide programs and services that support students' leadership development and promote student engagement in co-curricular activities.

The Associated Students of the University of San Francisco (ASUSF) Senate is the student body governance organization responsible for organizing major campus events, voicing student concern, and reviewing the ASUSF budget. USF's professional and academic organizations include chapters of many national and international groups, including the Professional Business Fraternity Delta Sigma Pi, the Lambda Iota Tau English Honor Society, Sigma Tau Delta, Jesuit Honor Society Alpha Sigma Nu, the National Society of Collegiate Scholars, National Political Science Honor Society Pi Sigma Alpha, Biological Honor Society Tri Beta, Accounting and Finance Honor Society Beta Alpha Psi and Psychology Honor Society Psi Chi. Professional organizations include the Family Business Association, Pre-Professional Health Committee, Pre-Dental Society, Hospitality Management Association, the Nursing Students Association, and the Entrepreneurship Club. Religious and spiritual organizations on campus include the Muslim Student Union, the USF chapter of InterVarsity Christian Fellowship, and the USF Hillel: The Foundation for Jewish Campus Life. USF leisure and hobby organizations include a chapter of many national organizations: Best Buddies, Outdoors and Environmental Education Club, Prism (formerly USF Queer Alliance), San Quentin TRUST Alliance, Knitting for Neighbors, Back to the Roots, Surf and Skate Club, and the Animation Comics and Video Games (ACV) Club. Cultural and multicultural organizations around campus serve international students, Indian students, Black students (the Black Student Union), Latin American students and Hawaiian Students. There are also groups specifically for women of color and Latinx women. Social justice clubs on campus include chapters of Amnesty International, School of the Americas Watch, Up 'til Dawn, Student Outreach for Refugees, Asylees and Immigrants, and Invisible Children. There is also a Politics Society, Philosophy Club, Women in Media Club, Women in Math Club (AWM), and Women in Science Club.

Student-produced media
The San Francisco Foghorn is the official student weekly newspaper and is sponsored by ASUSF. The Foghorn was founded in 1903 and was first called The Ignatian. In the 1930s when the college name was changed, the newspaper became the San Francisco Foghorn. The Foghorn has played a significant role on campus throughout the years and has some notable alumni: Pierre Salinger, editor of the San Francisco Chronicle and Press Secretary for President John F. Kennedy; well-known author and historian Kevin Starr; and Leo T. McCarthy, former California Lieutenant Governor. In 1961, the Foghorn received the American Newspaper Publishers Association "Pacemaker Award". In 1998, Associated Collegiate Press named it "College Paper of the Year".

From 1977, USF radio station KUSF broadcast online until 2011 when its license was sold to a Southern California-based classical radio station. KUSF had garnered international attention for its diverse musical programming, which varied from rock to hip hop to world music. It received numerous awards, including public service awards, for its weekly community service series. USF's other radio station, KDNZ, is student-run.

The University of San Francisco television station USFTV, founded in 2006 and entirely student-run, is broadcast on Channel 35 in the dormitories and around campus, with news, sports, and cultural programming. In 2008, USFtv students collaborated with Wyclef Jean to create a music video for his song, "If I Was President".

The Ignatian is USF's annual literary magazine published every spring, with a wide array of content from philosophical pieces to personal essays, short fiction, poetry, and photography.

Performing arts
USF has numerous student clubs for the performing arts, including a theater group (College Players), two-time Golden Gate Regional winning improvisational team (Awkward Silence), choir (ASUSF Voices), USF Don Marching Band, contemporary mass ensemble, and a dance program that focuses on social justice.

The College Players, founded in 1863, is considered one of the oldest student-run theater groups in the United States. Their annual production of The Vagina Monologues gives all its proceeds to women's charities in the Bay Area.

ASUSF Voices, in collaboration with the Performing Arts Department, contains a variety of choral ensembles, including jazz and popular. The USF Contemporary Mass Ensemble (vocal and instrumental) are USF alumni who perform at Sunday Masses in St. Ignatius Church. The USF dance program is affiliated with the Performing Arts and Social Justice Major. Students can enroll in traditional and modern dance classes and participate in the USF Dance Ensemble under professional choreographers.

Greek life
All social sororities and fraternities recognized by the university must participate in the Greek Council, which tends to the development of these organizations and their members. Chapters have some common mixers and socials, Thanksgiving potluck, Christmas clothing drive, Homecoming, and Greek Games.

Social fraternities and sororities
 Alpha Kappa Alpha sorority
 Alpha Phi Alpha fraternity
 Delta Sigma Theta sorority
 Delta Zeta sorority
 Delta Delta Delta sorority
 Kappa Alpha Theta sorority
 Lambda Theta Nu sorority
 Gamma Zeta Alpha fraternity
 Phi Delta Theta fraternity
 Pi Kappa Phi fraternity

Service
 Alpha Phi Omega co-ed service fraternity
    
Academic, Honor, and Professional Societies
 Alpha Kappa Delta (Sociology)
 Alpha Sigma Nu (Jesuit Honor Society)
 Beta Alpha Psi (Accounting and Finance)
 Beta Beta Beta (Biology)
 Gamma Gamma Gamma (Nursing)
 Lambda Pi Eta (Communication)
 Omicron Theta Chi (Nursing and Pre-Med)
 Phi Alpha Theta (History)
 Pi Mu Epsilon (Mathematics)
 Pi Sigma Alpha (Politics and Political Science)
 Psi Chi (Psychology)
 Sigma Tau Delta (International English)
 Sigma Theta Tau (Nursing)
 Theta Alpha Kappa (Religious Studies and Theology)

Student body

Notable students marked the early years of student diversity at the USF. Chan Chung Wing, whose parents had immigrated from near Canton, was in the first law class at then St. Ignatius College of Law. In 1929, the Filipino Ignatians was founded. In 1930, the African American Isaiah Fletcher was a starting tackle on the football team, years before most colleges became integrated. In 1936, Earl Booker, another African American, won the Intercollegiate Boxing Championship.

International students made up 15.5% of the student body in the fall of 2017. International students have a special orientation period and a variety of student groups like the International Student Association, Global Living Community, an International Advisory Council, and an International Network Program. USF sponsors an annual International Education Week with an international fair featuring consulates in the San Francisco area, storytelling opportunities, educational speakers, and a performance event called "Culturescape".

Undergraduate admissions
USF's undergraduate admissions are categorized as more selective by U.S. News & World Report, and ranks among the top 10% most selective of all colleges and universities in the United States. Also according to U.S. News & World Report, USF is ranked #1 in student body ethnic diversity for all non-historically black colleges and universities (HBCUs). 63% of the USF student body is from California.

For freshman enrolling in the fall of 2022, the average high school grade point average (GPA) was 3.68. 77% of all applicants admitted to University of San Francisco have an SAT score of 1200 or higher, an ACT score of 27 or higher.

Financial aid

In the 2019–2020 financial aid year, 82.0% of freshmen were given financial aid and/or scholarships at University of San Francisco, averaging $23,895 per person, placing USF in the top 20th percentile of all accredited colleges and universities nationwide. In addition to scholarships, 26.0% of first year students received federal grant aid, for an average of about $5,970 per person.

For the 2023–2024 year, tuition for full-time undergraduates is $57,670. The total estimated cost for one year, including fees, housing, and dining, is $83,662.

Residence Halls
Each residence hall or dormitory at the University of San Francisco contains at least one lounge, a kitchen, and laundry facilities. Halls are secured with a 24-hour desk staff. Community programs and activities are planned by Resident Advisors, Resident Ministers, Residence Hall Council, and Residence Hall Association.

On-campus
Fromm Hall (FR)
Gillion Hall (GI)
Hayes-Healy Hall (HH)
Lone Mountain (LMN)
Pedro Arrupe Hall (PA)
Toler Hall (TO)

Off-campus
Fulton House and Fulton House Cottage
Loyola Village (LV)

Athletics

USF competes in NCAA Division I and is a charter member of the West Coast Conference, along with local rivals Santa Clara University and Saint Mary's College of California. Sports offered are men's and women's basketball, cross country, golf, soccer, tennis, track and field, as well as men's baseball and women's volleyball and sand volleyball. USF's mascot is the Don and its colors are green and gold.

History
Athletics at USF dates back to its founding in 1855, when founder Anthony Maraschi, S.J., organized ball games as recreation for the first students. Intercollegiate competition dates back to 1907, when then St. Ignatius College began playing organized baseball, basketball, and rugby against other local colleges and high schools. Rivalries with neighboring Santa Clara University and Saint Mary's College of California have their origins in this early period.

1951 USF Dons football team

The 1951 University of San Francisco Dons football team, coached by Joe Kuharich, went undefeated with a record of 9–0, and produced nine future NFL players. Five became NFL Pro-Bowlers, and Gino Marchetti, Ollie Matson, and Bob St. Clair later were inducted into the Pro Football Hall of Fame – a record for one college team. Also the team's Burl Toler became the first African American official in the NFL. Future NFL Commissioner Pete Rozelle played a role as the Dons' Athletic Publicist. At the height of their success, due to the team having two African-American star players, Ollie Matson and Burl Toler, they were not invited to play in any of the college football bowl games hosted by the SEC (Southeastern Conference). The team, less Toler and Matson, was invited to the Orange Bowl but declined. Guard Dick Columbini said, "'No, we're not going to leave ‘em at home’ ... ‘We're going to play with ‘em or we’re not going to play.’" The USF Athletic Department was forced to drop its football program in 1952, due to a deficit in department funds.

Basketball

The  men's basketball program won three national championships: the 1949 NIT Championship, with Don Lofgran as MVP, and the 1955 and 1956 NCAA National Championships, going undefeated in the 1956 season. Led by NBA Hall of Famers Bill Russell and K.C. Jones, the 1956 Dons became the first undefeated team to win a national championship, winning a then-record 60 games in a row from 1954 to 1956 before losing an exhibition game to the USA Men's Olympic Basketball team. Also of note, the 1954-1955 USF basketball teams became the first major college or university basketball team to win a national title with three African American starters (Russell, Jones, and Hal Perry).

Soccer

The soccer program began at USF in 1931, and they succeeded from the start, winning five titles from 1932 to 1936. The team captain was All-American Gus Donoghue, who returned to the university as head coach in 1946, winning several titles, including a co-championship with Penn State in 1949.

At Donoghue's retirement in 1960, Stephen Negoesco, All-American and Holocaust survivor took over, having played under Donoghue in the 50s. He coached the team from 1962 to 2000, and led them to 540 wins and four national championships (1966, 1975, 1976, and 1980). Negoesco was inducted into the National Soccer Hall of Fame in 2003, having set a US record for games won in intercollegiate soccer competition.

Under Negoesco's successor, alumnus Erik Visser, the men's team earned the 2004, 2005, and 2008 WCC titles.

Alumni

See also

 St. Ignatius Institute
 List of colleges and universities in California
 List of Jesuit sites

Notes

References

Further reading 
 McGloin S.J., John Bernard. (1972). Jesuits by the Golden Gate: the Society of Jesus in San Francisco, 1849-1969. University of San Francisco.
 Pollack, Chris. Portland, Oregon: WestWinds Press.
 Ziajka, Alan. (2005). Legacy & Promise: 150 years of Jesuit education at the University of San Francisco. San Francisco: University of San Francisco, Association of Jesuit University Presses.
 Ziajka, Alan. (2012). The University of San Francisco School of Law: 100 Years of Educating for Justice. San Francisco: University of San Francisco, Association of Jesuit University Presses.
 Ziajka, Alan. (2014). Lighting the City, Changing the World: A History of the Sciences at the University of San Francisco. San Francisco: University of San Francisco, Association of Jesuit University Presses.

External links

 Official website

 
1855 establishments in California
Association of Catholic Colleges and Universities
Buildings and structures burned in the 1906 San Francisco earthquake
Educational institutions established in 1855
Jesuit universities and colleges in the United States
Landmarks in San Francisco
Roman Catholic Archdiocese of San Francisco
Catholic universities and colleges in California
Romanesque Revival architecture in California
Schools accredited by the Western Association of Schools and Colleges
Universities and colleges in Contra Costa County, California
Universities and colleges in Santa Clara County, California
Universities and colleges in Sacramento County, California
Universities and colleges in San Francisco
Universities and colleges in Sonoma County, California